Herwart Koppenhöfer (born 25 May 1946) is a retired German football player. He spent nine seasons in the Bundesliga with 1. FC Kaiserslautern, FC Bayern Munich, VfB Stuttgart, Kickers Offenbach and Hertha BSC.

Honours
 Bundesliga champion: 1971–72
 Bundesliga runner-up: 1969–70, 1970–71
 DFB-Pokal winner: 1970–71

References

External links
 

1946 births
Living people
German footballers
Germany under-21 international footballers
1. FC Kaiserslautern players
FC Bayern Munich footballers
VfB Stuttgart players
Kickers Offenbach players
Hertha BSC players
1. FSV Mainz 05 players
Bundesliga players
2. Bundesliga players
Association football defenders
People from Bad Dürkheim (district)
Footballers from Rhineland-Palatinate
West German footballers